Magic number may refer to:

Science and technology
 Magic number (chemistry), number of atoms or molecules forming an exceptionally stable cluster
 Magic number (physics), the number of nucleons that results in completely filled nuclear shells 
 Magic number (programming), either a unique identifier or a literal with unexplained meaning

Arts and entertainment
 Magic Numbers (game show), British 2010 television game show
 Magic Number (game), a pricing game on The Price is Right
 "Magic Number" (song), a song by Maaya Sakamoto
 "The Magic Number", a 1990 song by De La Soul from 3 Feet High and Rising
 The Magic Numbers, a British rock band
 Magic Numbers or Hannah Fry's Magic Numbers, a 2018 series of episodes about Mathematics, presented by Hannah Fry.

Other uses
 Magic number (sports), a number that indicates how close a team is to winning a season title
 Magic number (oil), the price per barrel of oil at which an oil exporting nation runs a deficit

See also
 "The Magical Number Seven, Plus or Minus Two", a 1956 paper by George Miller
 Magic constant, the sum in a magic square